Senator Heaton may refer to:

David Heaton (1823–1870), Ohio State Senate and Minnesota State Senate
Robert Douglas Heaton (1873–1933), Pennsylvania State Senate